This is a complete list of the operas of the Italian composer Giovanni Pacini (1796–1867).

List

Doubtful attributions to Pacini
 La chiarina (Carnival (1815–1816 San Moisè, Venice) [probable confusion with work by Giuseppe Farinelli]
 I virtuosi di teatro (1817 private performance, Venice) [possibly by Simon Mayr]
 La bottega di caffè (1817 private performance, Venice) [possibly by Francesco Gardi]

References
Notes

Sources
Rose, Michael and Balthazar, Scott L (1992), 'Pacini, Giovanni' in The New Grove Dictionary of Opera, ed. Stanley Sadie (London)

External links
Giovanni Pacini website  Retrieved 13 December 2012

Lists of operas by composer
 
Lists of compositions by composer